José Luis Izquierdo (born 11 August 1933) is a Spanish weightlifter. He competed in the men's featherweight event at the 1960 Summer Olympics.

References

1933 births
Living people
Spanish male weightlifters
Olympic weightlifters of Spain
Weightlifters at the 1960 Summer Olympics
Sportspeople from Toledo, Spain
20th-century Spanish people